Thomas Mompesson (1630–1701), of Mompesson House, The Close, Salisbury and St Martin's Lane, Westminster, was an English politician. He entered Lincoln's Inn in 1648, and was called to the bar in 1654.

He was a Member (MP) of the Parliament of England for Wilton in 1661, for Salisbury in March 1679, October 1679, 1695 and the period 6 January – 11 June 1701, for Old Sarum in 1681, 1685 and 1690, and for Wiltshire in 1689.

He was buried in Salisbury Cathedral.

References

1630 births
1701 deaths
People from Salisbury
People from Westminster
Members of Parliament for Salisbury
English MPs 1661–1679
English MPs 1679
English MPs 1680–1681
English MPs 1681
English MPs 1685–1687
English MPs 1689–1690
English MPs 1690–1695
English MPs 1695–1698
English MPs 1701